Invergowrie Bay is a tidal basin located near Invergowrie in eastern Scotland. Also in the bay are the Gowrie Burn and the Huntly Burn. There is a  walk along the shoreline from Invergowrie railway station to Kingoodie.

References

Bays of Scotland
Landforms of Perth and Kinross